The 2019–20 Prince Mohammad bin Salman League was the 3rd season of the Prince Mohammad bin Salman League under its current name, and 43rd season of the Saudi First Division since its establishment in 1976. The season started on 20 August 2019 and concluded on 20 September 2020. Fixtures for the 2019–20 season were announced on 14 July 2019. Al-Batin won the title, with Al-Qadsiah and Al-Ain following in second and third respectively.

On 7 March 2020, the Ministry of Sports announced that all matches would be played behind closed doors until further notice. On 14 March 2020, the Ministry suspended all sports competitions indefinitely due to the COVID-19 pandemic in Saudi Arabia. On 11 June 2020, the Ministry of Sports announced the resumption of sports activities with training starting on 21 June and games starting after 4 August 2020 and played behind closed doors. On 1 July 2020, the schedule for the remaining matches was released. It was announced that the league would resume on 4 August 2020 and end on 20 September 2020.

Overview

Rule changes
On 9 June 2019, the SAFF announced that the numbers of foreign players were decreased from 7 players to 4 players.

Teams
A total of 20 teams are contesting the league, including 13 sides from the 2018–19 season, 4 promoted teams from the Second Division and the three relegated sides from the Pro League.

The first team to be relegated to the MS League was Ohod, ending a 2-year stay in the Pro League following a 3–1 home defeat to Al-Fayha on 12 April 2019. The second team to be relegated was Al-Batin, ending a 3-year stay in the Pro League following a 1–0 home defeat to an already relegated Ohod side on 11 May 2019. The third and final team to be relegated was Al-Qadsiah, who were relegated on the final matchday following a 2–2 home draw with Al-Hazem. Al-Qadsiah were relegated after 4 consecutive seasons in the Pro League.

The first club to be promoted was Al-Bukayriyah who were promoted following a 1–1 away draw against Al-Jandal on 16 March 2019. The second club to be promoted was Hetten following a 2–0 home win against Afif on 29 March 2019. The third club to be promoted was Al-Thoqbah who were promoted following a 3–1 home win against Arar on 29 March 2019. The fourth and final club to be promoted was Al-Taqadom who were promoted on the final matchday following a 3–0 home win against Al-Muzahimiyyah.

Hetten were promoted as the winners of the Second Division and Al-Bukayriyah were promoted as the runners-up. Al-Thoqbah defeated Al-Taqadom in the third-place playoffs.

Al-Bukayriyah, Al-Taqadom, and Al-Thoqbah will play in the Prince Mohammad bin Salman League for the first time in their history. Hetten will play in their 8th overall season in the MS League. This will be their first season in the MS League following their relegation in the 2014–15 season.

Team changes
The following teams have changed division since the 2019–20 season.

Stadia and locations

1:  Al-Jeel and Al-Nojoom also use Al-Fateh Club Stadium (7,000 seats) as a home stadium.
2:  Al-Nahda, Al-Qadsiah and Al-Thoqbah also use Prince Mohamed bin Fahd Stadium (35,000 seats) as a home stadium.

Foreign players
The number of foreign players is limited to 4 per team.

Players name in bold indicates the player is registered during the mid-season transfer window.

League table

Positions by round
The table lists the positions of teams after each week of matches. In order to preserve chronological evolvements, any postponed matches are not included in the round at which they were originally scheduled but added to the full round they were played immediately afterward.

Results

Season progress

Statistics

Scoring

Top scorers

Hat-tricks 

Note
(H) – Home; (A) – Away

Clean sheets

Number of teams by region

See also
 2019–20 Saudi Professional League
 2019–20 Second Division
 2020 King Cup
 2019 Super Cup

References

2019–20 in Saudi Arabian football
Saudi First Division League seasons
Saudi
Saudi Arabia, 2